Events from the year 1839 in France.

Incumbents
 Monarch – Louis Philippe I

Events
9 January - The French Academy of Sciences announces the Daguerreotype photography process.
2 March - Legislative election held.
12–13 May - Failed insurrection led by Louis Auguste Blanqui, Armand Barbès, Martin Bernard, and the Société des Saisons as part of the struggle for French worker's rights.
22 June - Louis Daguerre receives patent for his camera (commercially available by September with the prize of 400 Francs).
6 July - Legislative election held.
19 August - French government gives Louis Daguerre a pension and gives the daguerreotype "for the whole world".
15 October - Emir Abdelkader of Algeria declares a jihad against the French.

Births

19 January - Paul Cézanne, painter (died 1906)
27 January - Marie Adolphe Carnot, chemist, mining engineer and politician (died 1920)
16 March - Sully Prudhomme, poet and essayist, winner of first Nobel Prize in Literature in 1901 (died 1907)
17 March - Louis Ricard, lawyer and politician (died 1921)
5 May - Louis Émile Javal, ophthalmologist (died 1907)
21 May - Joseph Albert Alexandre Glatigny, poet (died 1873)
9 August - Gaston Paris, writer and scholar (died 1903)
20 August - Gaston du Bousquet, steam locomotive engineer (died 1910)
9 October - Georges Leclanché, electrical engineer (died 1882)

Full date unknown
 Eugène Petit (1839–1886), flower painter and textile designer
 Albert Tissandier, architect, aviator, illustrator, editor and archaeologist (died 1906)

Deaths

10 January - Charles Philippe Lafont, violinist and composer (born 1781)
2 March - Charlotte Napoléone Bonaparte, niece of Napoleon I (born 1802)
18 March - Victoire Babois, poet and writer of elegies (born 1760)
2 April - Toussaint-Bernard Éméric-David, archaeologist and writer on art (born 1755)
9 May - Joseph Fiévée, journalist, novelist, essayist and playwright (born 1767)
13 May - Hugues-Bernard Maret, duc de Bassano, statesman and journalist (born 1763)
19 July - Maurice de Guérin, poet (born 1810)
30 September - Joseph François Michaud, historian and publicist (born 1767)
26 December - Laurent Jean François Truguet, admiral (born 1752)
31 December - Hyacinthe-Louis de Quelen, Archbishop of Paris (born 1778)

References

1830s in France